Karori Lunatic Asylum was a psychiatric hospital in Karori. Established in 1854, it was New Zealand's first asylum. The first patient was admitted in the same year, but it would be 1858 before a second patient arrived. Poorly run by untrained staff, there was only an occasional doctor's visit, and no attempt at cures. By 1871, there were 23 patients with a variety of disorders. The facility closed in 1873 with the patients transferred to Mount View Lunatic Asylum. In 1875, Karori School opened on the grounds of Karori Lunatic Asylum.

References

Buildings and structures in Wellington City
Psychiatric hospitals in New Zealand
Defunct hospitals in New Zealand
Hospitals established in 1854
1873 disestablishments in New Zealand
1854 establishments in New Zealand